Sporting Clube Petróleos do Bié best known as Sporting do Bié is a multisports club from Kuito, Angola. The club's football team contests at the Angolan Gira Angola and Girabola competitions.

Following Angola's independence in 1975, the club went out of business and was later revamped by merging with Desportivo Sonangol and later on with Kuito's Direcção Provincial da Justiça soccer team and was renamed União Sport do Bié. Later on, it was again renamed as União Petro do Bié. In the 1990s, now being officially sponsored by Total Angola and Sonangol, the club was again renamed to its current denomination, Sporting Clube Petróleos do Bié.

League & Cup Positions

President's history
 Paulo Jorge Capama ''(2020–2024)

Manager history

Players

See also
 Girabola
 Gira Angola

References

Football clubs in Angola
Sports clubs in Angola